Merkers Adventure Mines are a visitor attraction in Krayenberggemeinde in the Wartburgkreis district of Thuringia, Germany, owned and operated by K+S AG of Kassel. They lie near the village of Merkers. The mines have a long history of salt extraction, and hold the record for concealing large amounts of Nazi gold during World War II. A hundred tons of gold and many works of art presumed to be stolen were discovered by the liberating United States Army in 1945.

Context
The Merkers Mine drops 860m below the surface into the 'Werra-Revier' band of potash bearing salt. There, at a constant temperature of 28C, are 4600 kilometers of tunnels. Visitors are lowered in the hoisting cage at over 10m/ sec (30 km/h) down to the 500m galleries. There they are driven on 20-kilometre long tour of the mine, seeing an underground mining museum, a room where in 1945 the 'Gold und Devisenreserven der Deutschen Reichbank' dubbed the Nazi gold was stored, the world's largest underground bucket-wheel excavator, simulated blasting and a laser show in the world's largest underground concert hall. Also, in 1980 a crystal grotto was discovered. Here visitors see enormous salt crystals, some over 1 m in size.

Popular culture
The salt crystals of Merkers Mine are featured in Episode 2 of the BBC series, The Code.

Documents stolen (fictionally) from the Nazi hoard in the mine form the basis for the plot of the Len Deighton novel XPD.

Gallery

References

External links

 Webseite zur 700-Jahr-Feier des Ortes Merkers mit geschichtlichen Informationen
 Erlebnisbergwerk Merkers Slideshow.
 Kristallsalzschlotte im Erlebnis Bergwerk Merkers, Geotopbeschreibung der Thüringer Landesanstalt für Umwelt und Geologie (TLUG)

Salt mines in Germany
Wartburgkreis
European Route of Industrial Heritage Anchor Points